Ahmet Tansu Taşanlar (born 1984) is a Turkish actor.

Life and career
Tansu Taşanlar was born on 31 May 1984 in Ankara. He is a graduate of Selçuk University State Conservatory with a degree in theatre studies. He briefly worked at the Bursa and Ankara State Theatres and made his television debut in 2008 with a role in the series Küçük Kadınlar. He simultaneously continued his career on stage and appeared in various plays. He later had a minor role in the historical drama Muhteşem Yüzyıl before appearing in supporting roles in the series Kara Para Aşk and Vatanım Sensin. He was further recognized with his role as Nazım in the series Çukur and rose to prominence after being cast in a leading role in the series Hercai.

Filmography

References

External links 

1984 births
Turkish male television actors
Living people
Male actors from Ankara
Selçuk University alumni